Stuart Burgess (born 22 October 1962) is a Scottish professional footballer who played as a central defender. He played in the Scottish Premier Division with Falkirk. During his career, he played for four clubs, making more than 350 league appearances.

Now living in Perth, Australia. Stuart has a son named Cameron, who has played for Fulham and Ross County.

References

1962 births
Living people
Scottish footballers
Association football defenders
Albion Rovers F.C. players
East Fife F.C. players
Falkirk F.C. players
Kilmarnock F.C. players
Bathgate Thistle F.C. players
Scottish Football League players
Sportspeople from Broxburn, West Lothian
Footballers from West Lothian